The Ray (real name Raymond C. "Ray" Terrill) is a fictional character, a superhero in the . He is the second character to use the codename the Ray. Ray Terrill first appeared in The Ray #1 (February 1992), and was created by Jack C. Harris and Joe Quesada.

Ray Terrill appeared in The CW's fourth annual Arrowverse crossover event with Arrow, The Flash, the Legends of Tomorrow, and Supergirl titled "Crisis on Earth-X". He was played by Russell Tovey, who would also voice character in the CW Seed series Freedom Fighters: The Ray. Tovey returned in a cameo in the crossover event Crisis on Infinite Earths.

Publication history
Ray's debut miniseries was created by Jack C. Harris and Joe Quesada, edited by Jim Owsley.

Fictional character biography

Origins
From a very young age, Raymond Terrill is told by his supposed father that exposure to direct sunlight will kill him. Privately tutored in his window-darkened home, he is dubbed "Night Boy" by the media. At the age of eighteen, Ray learns the truth about his heritage while at the deathbed of his father, "Happy" Terrill. The dying man admits that he was the Golden Age Ray, and that exposure to sunlight will activate Raymond's own light-based superpowers. As a child he would have been unable to control such power and, thus, had to be kept in darkness.

At the funeral for "Happy" Terrill, Ray meets his cousin, Hank, who urges him to become a superhero like his father. When he refuses, "Happy" shows up very much alive, in his classic Ray costume and looking far younger than he should, to meet his son. He tells Raymond that he was in fact raised by his uncle, Thomas Terrill, and that he must use his newfound powers to save the Earth from a powerful cosmic light-entity. Raymond eventually decides to take up the mantle of "the Ray", defeats the evil Doctor Polaris, and succeeds in dissuading the light entity from its destructive purpose.

Justice League
Ray's adventures continue, bringing him to battle with villains such as Brimstone, Neron, and Vandal Savage. Following the death of Superman, Ray is recruited into the Justice League for roughly a year of service. During this time, Ray has a brief romance with Black Canary. His tenure with the League takes place as the team was split into different factions, one led by Wonder Woman who consistently deferred to the team's United Nations mandate and the other, more hotheaded Captain Atom. Ray was present when fellow League member Ice was killed by the Overlord, prompting a number of member departures and signifying the end of the League operating closely with the U.N. Ray is then asked to join the ranks of Justice League Task Force, led by Martian Manhunter. With the Task Force he shared a number of adventures, including repeated tangling with Vandal Savage. Ray eventually began to view fellow Task Force members Gypsy and Triumph as a family and viewed the Martian Manhunter in more of a fatherly role than his actual father. This was complicated by Triumph's frequent conflicts for leadership with the Manhunter. Though Ray's own issues (as shown within his solo series, which ran concurrently with Justice League Task Force) caused him to leave the team, he would eventually leave to aid them in their last off-world mission to help the robot L-Ron who was then inhabiting Despero's body. The last adventure of Justice League Task Force involved their traveling to the center of the Earth and into Skartaris, world of the Warlord. Ray's body was taken over by a mystic and used against the team until he was freed by his friends.

Solo series
Ray's own monthly comic, penned by Christopher Priest and drawn mainly by Howard Porter, ran for 28 issues from 1994 to 1996. In this series, Ray confronts several villains and anti-heroes, including an out of control child with powers similar to Ray's (who turns out to be his half-brother, Joshua), and a computer game villain known as Death Masque that has somehow become real. His relationship with his father is strained several times as he discovers the extent of Happy's manipulative streak, and the well-intentioned deceptions he had perpetrated concerning his own family. When Triumph, disregarding the orders of the Martian Manhunter, refuses to help Ray deal with Death Masque, Ray turns instead to Vandal Savage for help. Savage coaches Ray for some time, utilizing his little-used skill with computers and giving Ray a high business position. When Death Masque targets Ray's mother, he manages to re-program and then destroy the computerized villain for good. A woman claiming to be Ray's girlfriend from the future brutally attacks Savage in order to show Ray, who had begun to think of Savage on almost friendly terms, that Savage stole body parts from his many descendants whenever he was critically injured. This prompts Ray to sever his ties with Savage. When Ray's mother learns he is still alive (Happy led her to believe Ray died in childbirth) they share a happy reunion. He is also faced with glimpses of an unpleasant possible future which he may have averted by the series' conclusion.
 
After the disbanding of Justice League Task Force to make way for the newly formed JLA, Ray keeps a Justice League reserve-member status - but is rarely seen in DC Comics for several years. Ray also joins another team, the Forgotten Heroes, led by Resurrection Man. Brought together to take down Vandal Savage, the team eventually disbands and Ray presumably continues a solo hero career.

In the Final Night incident, Ray participates in making a secondary sun in order to try and fool the Sun-Eater. He also personally watches out for a small Mexican town, using his powers to make sure it is sufficiently heated. This task uses up most of Ray's power until he collapses, drained. A kiss from Fire provides enough power to rejuvenate Ray and with the help of Zatanna and Firestorm, the fate of the town is assured.

Around this time he is approached by the demon Neron, who attempts to gain his soul. Neron, despite being far beyond the concepts of gender, has to resort to pretending to be the villainess Circe after part of the plan involves a kiss and Ray comes to believe he has kissed a guy. In the end, Ray does not fulfill his part of the bargain and, as a result, does not lose his soul.

Ray later takes part in saving the universe against the might of an ancient ultra-powerful weapon called Mageddon. Following this, Ray appears at a Titans West recruitment drive party in Los Angeles. Although he joins Green Lantern's Justice League of Air during the "Justice Leagues" crisis (wherein each member forms his or her own minor league), he soon is back adventuring on his own.

In the fight against Imperiex during DC's Our Worlds at War crossover, Ray is called upon as a reserve member of the JSA. On their mission, Ray, along with several other modern-day "Freedom Fighters", fight to release the captured Daxamite people from imprisonment. Although Ray is severely injured in battle, the team succeeds in their mission and Ray quickly heals.

Young Justice
Ray joins Young Justice after saving a boy's life while the team rides a tram car to F.D.R. Island. He is with the team during their assault on Zandia on behalf of Empress and uses up his entire supply of energy to strike a crippling blow against the vampire Lady Zand. In the interests of expanding Young Justice, then leader Wonder Girl agrees to make the team part of a reality TV show. This backfires when Secret, having been corrupted, turns against Young Justice and the footage is broadcast on the Internet. After Secret is depowered by Darkseid, Ray leaves the team, which itself disbands soon afterward following the death of Donna Troy. Soon afterward, he meets the Nowhere Men, the deadly figments of a writer's imagination accidentally brought to life. With the goal of wiping out the individuality of the world, the Nowhere Men began by attacking superheroes. They use beams that cause a type of "suspended animation". Ray is caught in one of these beams, along with Elongated Man and a new Major Victory. After a long battle with Superman, the Nowhere Men are defeated and Ray and the others are freed.

Freedom Fighters and Infinite Crisis
Ray joins other JSA reserves to help contain the damage caused by the villainous trio of Mordru, Obsidian and Eclipso. He later joins a new, government-sponsored Freedom Fighters team. However, the Freedom Fighters are ambushed and many of the team are murdered by the Secret Society in Infinite Crisis #1. The villainous Dr. Light is the Society member who manages to capture Ray alive. As he is dragged away by the Psycho-Pirate, the barely conscious Terrill is told that Luthor (Alexander Luthor, Jr. of Earth-Three) needs him alive. Ray is captured for Alex's master plan, but later escapes during the battle in the Arctic along with Power Girl, Breach, Lady Quark and all the other prisoners attached to the reality altering tower created from the Anti-Monitor's corpse. There, Ray deduces that it was Psycho-Pirate responsible for manipulating Bizarro into beating the Human Bomb to death. Before managing to use his emotion-altering powers on Ray and Power Girl, the Psycho-Pirate is definitively slain by the enraged Black Adam.

52
During Week 1 of 52, Ray is met by an overjoyed Black Canary as various heroes from around the world see each other for the first time since Infinite Crisis. Ray was also part of the large superhero team drafted by Alan Scott in order to fight Black Adam, who was, at the time, menacing China.

One Year Later
At the beginning of DC's One Year Later event, Ray Terrill's whereabouts are unknown. In the Superman storyline "Up Up and Away", Ray tries to repower a weakened Superman along with the heroic Dr. Light, unsuccessfully.

Ray finally returns to action in Uncle Sam and the Freedom Fighters #7. Wearing a new costume, he encounters and soundly defeats the traitorous Stan Silver, who has taken the name "Ray" for himself. Ray Terrill then joins the new Freedom Fighters. Though captured by the villainous Red Bee, Ray and the rest of the Fighters eventually manage to turn the tables on the insect alien invaders, defeating them. In order to accomplish this, Ray's father Happy drank from the desert oasis of Neon the Unknown, vastly increasing his own powers and leading Happy to take the name Neon for himself. Ray and Happy are later shown at a baseball game, attempting to reconcile their rocky relationship.

Final Crisis
The Ray became an important part of the resistance against Darkseid and his Justifiers. He acted as a courier due to his ability to escape the Anti-Life Equation's powers and delivered the Daily Planet issues still being produced from Superman's Fortress of Solitude. When the Justifiers attacked the Justice League Watch Tower, Ray turned into a carrier wave capable of teleporting most of the people there away, although Green Arrow chose to stay behind in order to buy them time. He later managed to create a massive Metron Emblem across Earth, severely disrupting the Anti-Life broadcast and damaging Darkseid's operation enough to seriously cripple it.

Blackest Night
During the Blackest Night crossover event, Ray managed to capture a Black Lantern power ring in a cage of light, at the behest of Simon Stagg, and brought it to an underground lab for examination. The lab was then attacked by a swarm of Black Lanterns. Ray was last seen fighting a number of Western-themed Black Lanterns, including the deceased Super-Chief and Scalphunter. After ordering the other living humans out of the line of fire, Ray released enough power to bring down the underground complex. Despite this, neither of the two humans he bought time for managed to escape the town alive. His condition was, at the time, unknown, but he has since appeared alive and unharmed.

Outsiders
While escaping from a hostile attacking force, Black Lightning, Metamorpho, and Owlman are forced to take refuge in Simon Stagg's secret base previously seen partially destroyed during the attack of the Black Lanterns. After an initial fight with Stagg's employee Freight Train, Metamorpho is later attacked by Stagg's manservant Java and merged with the chemical monstrosity Chemo. After Owlman and Freight Train defeat Chemo, they contact Stagg, who sends Ray, apparently still in the man's employment, to help separate Metamorpho from Chemo, though Ray confesses he has no idea how Stagg knew of Metamorpho's condition.

Uncle Sam and the Freedom Fighters
Throughout all of this, Ray remained affiliated with Uncle Sam and the Freedom Fighters as they continued to fight for America against such threats as the Living America, a superhuman prison break and Jester and the Arcadians. Finally, the team was destroyed by the one foe they could not fight - government cutbacks.

DC Rebirth
Like the earlier version of the character, the DC Rebirth version of Ray Terrill was told that any exposure to direct sunlight will kill him. Running away from home as a teen, he soon discovered that exposure to light grants him light-based superpowers, including flight, light projection and invisibility. Ray eventually settles in Vanity, Portland (previously seen in Aztek) where he saves a childhood friend from a supervillain hate-group. This version of the Ray is openly gay. He is later recruited into Batman's new Justice League of America which includes Atom III, Vixen, Black Canary, Killer Frost III and Lobo. He also dates Xenos, the League engineer.

Other versions
New Super-Man features a character named Sunbeam (an analog of the Ray).

In the comic book Countdown: Arena, Ray is revealed as an analogue of the Wildstorm Universe character Apollo, another light-based superhero.

Powers and abilities
Ray absorbs, stores and processes light; uses the energy to fly and create destructive bursts of radiation. His energy capacity is virtually limitless. He is capable of manipulating light to create illusions and even solid light constructs, as well as render himself and others invisible. He can convert his body completely into any wavelength of the EM Spectrum. No physical harm from impact can come to him in this form (as demonstrated when Lobo punched Ray through his skull). This process can also be used to "reset" damage that his physical form has already sustained (seen in the story "Ray Gets Shot in the Head" where a bullet was lodged at the base of his skull; Ray was told by doctors he would be paralyzed from the neck down, but after turning to his energy form, the damage was healed instantly). As pure energy, he can travel at the speed of light and cross space unassisted.

In other media

Arrowverse
Ray Terrill / Ray appears in media set in the Arrowverse, portrayed by Russell Tovey. This version hails from Tulsa, Oklahoma on Earth-1, but was transported to Earth-X, where he received his powers from his dying Earth-X counterpart, joined the Freedom Fighters in fighting the New Reichsmen, and entered a relationship with Citizen Cold.

 First appearing in the live-action crossover event "Crisis on Earth-X", he joins forces with heroes from Earth-1 and Earth-38 to defeat the New Reichsmen. Despite being offered to return to Earth-1, Terrill elects to stay to defeat the New Reichsmen's remnants.
 Terrill appears in the CW Seed prequel animated series Freedom Fighters: The Ray, voiced by Tovey.
 Tovey makes an uncredited appearance in the live-action crossover event "Crisis on Infinite Earths".

Miscellaneous
 Ray Terrill / Ray appears in issue #17 of the Justice League Unlimited tie-in comic book.

References

Characters created by Joe Quesada
Comics characters introduced in 1992
DC Comics LGBT superheroes
DC Comics male superheroes
DC Comics metahumans
DC Comics titles
DC Comics characters who are shapeshifters
DC Comics characters who can move at superhuman speeds
DC Comics characters with accelerated healing
DC Comics characters with superhuman strength
Fictional businesspeople
Fictional characters from Philadelphia
Fictional characters who can manipulate light
Fictional characters who can turn invisible
Fictional characters with absorption or parasitic abilities
Fictional characters with energy-manipulation abilities
Fictional characters with nuclear or radiation abilities
Fictional LGBT characters in television
Fictional gay males
LGBT characters in animation

de:The Ray